Apache MyFaces Trinidad is a JSF framework including a large, enterprise quality component library, supporting critical features such as accessibility (e.g. Section 508), right-to-left languages, etc. It also includes a set of framework features, including:
 Partial-page rendering support for the entire component set
 Integrated client-side validation
 A dialog framework
 pageFlowScope, for communicating between pages

Trinidad is a subproject of Apache MyFaces project and was donated by Oracle, where it was known as ADF Faces. It was renamed Trinidad after a long voting process. Trinidad is more than just a component library because it also contains a lot of goodies which solve common development challenges.

References

MyFaces
MyFaces
MyFaces